João Gomes may refer to

People
João Gomes (basketball) (born 1985), Portuguese basketball player also known as Betinho
João Gomes (fencer) (born 1975) Portuguese fencer
João Gomes (footballer, born 1996), Portuguese football defender
João Gomes (footballer, born 2001), Brazilian footballer midfielder
João Gomes (singer) (born 2002), Brazilian singer
João Gomes Júnior (born 1986), Brazilian breaststroke swimmer
João Amorim (footballer, born July 1992) (João Filipe Amorim Gomes, born 1992), Portuguese football player also known as Amorim
João Cravinho (João Cardona Gomes Cravinho), born 1936), Portuguese politician
João Diogo Gomes de Freitas (born 1988), Portuguese football player
João Paulo Gomes da Costa (born 1986), Brazilian football left back
João Pedro Gomes Camacho (born 1994), Portuguese football player 
João Santos (basketball) (João Pedro Gomes Santos, born 1979), Portuguese basketball player
César Pereira (João César Gomes Pereira, born 1975), Portuguese football goalkeeper also known as César

Other
João Gomes Bridge, on the Portuguese island of Madeira